Pedro Julio Santiago Guzman (born March 25, 1961), also known as "Pellé", is a Puerto Rican politician affiliated with the New Progressive Party (PNP). He was elected to the Puerto Rico House of Representatives in 2012 to represent District 10.

References

External links
Pedro Julio Santiago Profile on El Nuevo Día

Living people
New Progressive Party members of the House of Representatives of Puerto Rico
1961 births